The molecular formula C17H25NO4 (molar mass: 307.38 g/mol, exact mass: 307.1784 u) may refer to:

 Ibopamine
 Buflomedil

Molecular formulas